Ljósá is a village located on Eysturoy in the Faroe Islands, in Eiði Municipality. It is located 4 km south of Eiði and 4 km north of Svínáir.

The village was founded around 1840.

References

Populated coastal places in the Faroe Islands
Eiði Municipality